Andrena helvola  , the coppice mining bee, is a Palearctic species of mining bee from the genus Andrena.<ref name = bwars>{{cite web | author = M. Edwards | year = 2012 | url = https://www.bwars.com/bee/andrenidae/andrena-helvola | title = Andrena helvola | access-date = 11 December 2021 | publisher = The Bees Wasps and Ants Recording Society}}</ref>

The females have a pile of reddish-brown hair on the top of the thorax with a rather thick pile of orange or yellowish hair on the first and second tergites and a short grey pile on the third and fourth tergites.

TaxonomyAndrena helvola was first formally described in 1758 as Apis helvola by Carl Linnaeus. In 1775 Fabricius described the genus Andrena and in 1912 Viereck designated A. helvola as its type species.

Distribution and habitatAndrena helvola is found in the Western Palearctic from Great Britain to Russia, north to southern Scandinavia and south to the Pyrenees, Alps, the Balkans and Anatolia. In Great Britain is mainly found in southern England and Wales with scattered occurrences into Scotland. It is found in deciduous woodland growing on a number of different types of soil.

BiologyAndrena helvola is a solitary bee which nests singly or in loose aggregations. Its nests are parasitised by the cuckoo bee Nomada panzeri and the males are known to be parasitised by the fly, Stylops nevinsonii. It is a polylectic species and has been recorded feeding on nectar and collecting pollen from the flowers of wood spurge (Euphorbia amygdaloides), field maple (Acer campestre), hawthorn (Crataegus spp) and holly (Ilex aquifolium), as well as bird cherry (Prunus padus), cherry plum (Prunus cerasifera), white willow (Salix alba) and dandelions (Taraxacum spp.''). It is a univoltine bee which is active from April up to June in Great Britain between April and June.

References

External links
Images representing  Andrena helvola

Hymenoptera of Europe
helvola
Bees described in 1758
Taxa named by Carl Linnaeus